The Princess Anne Historic District is located in Princess Anne the county seat of Somerset County, Maryland on Maryland's Eastern Shore. There has been little change due to industry or other development, and the town retains much of its historic character since its founding in the early 18th century. It has been the governmental center since the county was formed in 1742 and the present courthouse is one of the most architecturally distinguished in the state. Within the historic district are a few pre-Revolutionary structures, a high concentration of Federal and Victorian architecture, vernacular dwellings as well as 19th and early-20th century commercial and public buildings. The district contains approximately 270 structures of which nearly 90 percent are contributing to the character of the district.

Among the contributing structures are:
 Beckford Avenue Tenant Houses (c.1870)
 Boxwood Gardens (c.1850)
 Charles Jones House (c.1780)
 Colonel George Handy House (1805–06)
 John W. Crisfield House ("Somerset House") (c.1852 and earlier)
 Linden Hill (c.1750, c.1835)
 Littleton Long House (c.1830) (See Somerset County Historical Trust)
 Nutter's Purchase (c.1800)
 St. Andrews Episcopal Church (1767–73, 1859, 1896)
 Teackle Gatehouse (c.1805)
 Washington Hotel (c.1797, 1838)
 William Geddes House ("Tunstall Cottage") (c.1755)
 William W. Johnston House (c.1834-35)
 Woolford-Elzey House (c.1788, c.1840)

It was listed on the National Register of Historic Places in 1980.

References

External links
Historic District Walking Tour
, including photo in 1976, at Maryland Historical Trust website

Historic districts in Somerset County, Maryland
Historic districts on the National Register of Historic Places in Maryland
Queen Anne architecture in Maryland
Federal architecture in Maryland
Italianate architecture in Maryland
National Register of Historic Places in Somerset County, Maryland